Ouroboros is an ancient symbol depicting a snake or dragon swallowing its tail.

Ouroboros or Ouroborus may also refer to:

Film and television
 Ouroboros (manga), a Japanese seinen manga and anime by Kanzaki Yuuya
 Ouroboros (TV series), a 2015 Japanese television drama based on the manga
 "Ouroboros", an episode of the TV series Andromeda
 "Ouroboros", an episode of the TV series Charlie Jade
 "Ouroboros" (Fear the Walking Dead), an episode of the TV series Fear the Walking Dead
 "Ouroboros" (Red Dwarf), an episode of the TV series Red Dwarf
 "Ouroboros", an episode of the TV series Shameless

Music
 Oroboros, a jam band by Jim Miller
 Ouroboros: Seasons of Life—Women's Passages, an oratorio by Kay Gardner
 Uroboros (album), a 2008 album by Dir en grey
 Ouroboros (Ray LaMontagne album), 2016
 "Oroborus", a song by Gojira from the 2008 album The Way of All Flesh

Other uses
 Ouroboros (protocol), the proof of stake blockchain algorithm
 Ouroborus, a reptile genus containing the armadillo girdled lizard
 Ouroboros or The Mechanical Extension of Mankind, a 1926 novel by Garet Garrett
 Ouroboros, a community weblog devoted to research in the biology of aging; see 
 Ouroboros, a massive station in Mega Man ZX Advent
 Ouroboros, the overarching antagonists of the Trails series
 Ouroboros, the mecha-like transformations of the main characters in Xenoblade Chronicles 3